"Manchester United" was a single released by the English football team Manchester United in 1976. It reached number 50 in the UK Singles Chart.

References

1976 singles
Manchester United F.C. songs